Prorasea fernaldi is a moth in the family of Crambidae. It was described by Eugene G. Munroe in 1974. It is found in North America, where it has been recorded from Colorado, New Mexico and Wyoming.

References

Evergestinae
Moths described in 1974